Horáček (feminine Horáčková) is a Czech surname, it may refer to:

 Barbora Horáčková, Czech archer
 Jan Horáček, Czech professional ice hockey player
 Judy Horacek (born 1961), Australian cartoonist, illustrator and writer
 Michal Horáček (born 1952), Czech entrepreneur, producer
 Michal Horáček (orienteer), Czech orienteering competitor
 Mike Horacek (born 1973), American football wide receiver
 Milan Horáček (born 1946), German politician, a founding member of the German Green Party, and a former MEP
 Petr Horáček, Czech boxer
 Tony Horacek (born 1967), retired Canadian professional ice hockey left winger

See also 
 Horák

Czech-language surnames